Al Cantello (born June 9, 1931) is a retired American javelin thrower as a member of the United States Marine Corps. He was the coach of the men's distance running program at the United States Naval Academy from 1963 to 2018.

He graduated from La Salle University in Philadelphia in 1955. In 1959, he set the world record in the javelin and won the bronze medal at the 1959 Pan American Games and made the US Olympic team in 1960 Summer Olympics in Rome. Despite having the second longest throw (79.72m) in the games during the qualifying rounds, he finished tenth (with an official throw of 74.7m). Cantello won the AAU title in 1959 and 1960 and held a world ranking of No. 4 for both years. In 1964, Sport magazine named Cantello to its all-time track and field team and voted him the world's greatest competitor in the javelin. He was known for his form, in which he would throw his whole body into the throw and end in a semi-handstand. His personal best throw, with the old javelin type, was 86.04 metres, achieved in June 1959 in Compton.

He coached at the United States Naval Academy for more than 50 years where he was named NCAA Mid-Atlantic Coach of the Year three times. He retired in 2018. While at La Salle, Cantello was twice named to the Track and Field All-American team. He won the javelin contest at four straight Mid-Atlantic Conference Track and Field Championships and three times won the javelin toss at the Penn Relays.

In 2013 Cantello was inducted into the U.S. Track & Field and Cross Country Coaches Association (USTFCCCA) Coaches Hall of Fame along with Ron Allice, Dennis Craddock, Jim Hunt, Curtis Frye and Paul Olsen.

References

External links
  La Salle Univ. article
  Navy Sports profile
  Cantello's quotes

1931 births
Living people
American male javelin throwers
Athletes (track and field) at the 1959 Pan American Games
Athletes (track and field) at the 1960 Summer Olympics
Olympic track and field athletes of the United States
La Salle University alumni
United States Marines
United States Naval Academy
World record setters in athletics (track and field)
Pan American Games medalists in athletics (track and field)
Pan American Games bronze medalists for the United States
Medalists at the 1959 Pan American Games